Kenneth Green (20 November 1929 – March 2012) was an English professional footballer who played as a forward in the Football League for Grimsby Town.

References

1929 births
2012 deaths
Footballers from Kingston upon Hull
English footballers
Association football forwards
Selby Town F.C. players
Grimsby Town F.C. players
English Football League players